Hercules and the Erymanthian Boar is an outdoor sculpture by Louis Tuaillon, located at Lützowplatz in Berlin-Tiergarten, Germany. It represents Hercules fighting the Erymanthian Boar, one of his Twelve Labours.

References

External links
 

Animal sculptures in Germany
Mitte
Outdoor sculptures in Berlin
Pigs in art
Sculptures of men in Germany
Statues in Germany